Daniel E. Riordan (September 7, 1863 – November 19, 1942) was a member of the Wisconsin State Senate.

Biography
Riordan was born on September 7, 1863 in Berlin, Wisconsin. He moved to Hayward, Wisconsin in 1891 and to Eagle River, Wisconsin in 1892 before later moving to Milwaukee, Wisconsin. Riordan taught school and was a lawyer. He also became involved in real estate around 1900. He died on November 19, 1942 in Oshkosh, Wisconsin.

Political career
Riordan represented the 30th District in the Senate during the 1897 through 1903 sessions. In 1895, he had been appointed as a judge of the municipal court of Vilas County, Wisconsin by Governor William H. Upham. The following year, Riordan declined a nomination for District Attorney of Vilas County. He was a Republican.

References

People from Berlin, Wisconsin
People from Eagle River, Wisconsin
Politicians from Milwaukee
Republican Party Wisconsin state senators
Municipal judges in the United States
Wisconsin lawyers
Schoolteachers from Wisconsin
1863 births
1942 deaths